Vintilă is both a masculine Romanian given name and a surname. Notable people with the name include:

Surname
Octavian Vintilă (born 1938), Romanian fencer
Simona Vintilă, Romanian footballer

Given name
Vintilă Brătianu (1867–1930), Romanian politician and Prime Minister of Romania
Vintilă Ciocâlteu (1890–1947), Romanian physician and academic
Vintilă Cossini (1913–2000), Romanian footballer
Vintilă Horia (1915–1992), Romanian writer
Vintilă Mihăilescu (born 1951), Romanian anthropologist
Vintilă Russu-Șirianu (1897–?), Romanian journalist, memoirist, and translator
Vintilă of Wallachia, ruler of Wallachia in May 1574

See also
Vintilă Vodă, commune in Buzău County, Romania

Romanian masculine given names
Romanian-language surnames